Frederico Gil and Ivan Dodig were the defending champions, but Dodig decided not to participate.
As a result, Gil partnered up with James Cerretani. They lost to Yves Allegro and Jesse Huta Galung already in the first round.

Seeds

Draw

Draw

External links
 Main Draw

Tennislife Cup - Doubles
Tennislife Cup